The 2013 GEICO 400 was a NASCAR Sprint Cup Series stock car race held on September 15, 2013, at  Chicagoland Speedway in Joliet, Illinois, United States. Contested over 267 laps on the  tri-oval, it was the twenty-seventh in the 2013 NASCAR Sprint Cup Series season, as well as the first race in the ten-race Chase for the Sprint Cup, which ends the season.

Matt Kenseth of Joe Gibbs Racing won the race, his career best sixth of the season, teammate Kyle Busch finished second, Kevin Harvick, Kurt Busch, and Jimmie Johnson rounded out the top five.

Report

Background
The racetrack has a grandstand capacity of 75,000 spectators, and has a  garage area. Brad Keselowski was the race's defending champion.

Before the race, Matt Kenseth led the Drivers' Championship with 2,015 points, with Jimmie Johnson and Kyle Busch tied for second place with 2,012. Kevin Harvick and Carl Edwards had a total of 2,006 points, while Joey Logano and Greg Biffle were sixth and seventh with 2,003. Clint Bowyer, and Dale Earnhardt Jr., Kurt Busch, Kasey Kahne, Ryan Newman, and Jeff Gordon rounded out the Chase field with 2,000 points each. In the Manufacturers' Championship, Chevrolet was leading with 178 points, ten points ahead of Toyota. Ford, with 141 points, was in the third position.

Practice and qualifying
Three practice sessions were held before the race. The first session, scheduled on September 13, 2013, was 90 minutes long. The second and third, held a day later on September 14, 2013, were 55 and 50 minutes long. In the first practice session, Ricky Stenhouse Jr. was the quickest with a best lap time of 28.774 seconds. Kurt Busch followed in second, ahead of Edwards and Johnson in third and fourth. Juan Pablo Montoya was scored fifth quickest with a best lap time of 28.853, seven-tenths slower than Stenhouse. Logano, Biffle, Aric Almirola, Brad Keselowski, and Bowyer completed the top-ten.

After the first practice session, NASCAR discussed the second half of what became known as Spingate, the race fixing scandal that took place during the last ten laps of the previous week's race in Richmond, which was still under investigation. NASCAR had uncovered radio chatter between two Roush Fenway Racing affiliated teams (Penske and Front Row). At 2:55 PM CT, NASCAR held a press conference to discuss the results and placed both Ford teams in question on probation for the rest of 2013. Furthermore, after discussions that took place because of the first part of the rule where which Michael Waltrip Racing ordered Brian Vickers to pit in order to help Martin Truex Jr. get into the Chase, and later disqualifying the #56 of Truex from the Chase while reinstating the #39 of Ryan Newman, NASCAR had no choice but to add Jeff Gordon, who was the victim of both manipulations, to the Chase as the 13th team. Chairman Brian France has always had the power to expand the Chase field in exceptional circumstances, and decided to invoke this power in order to add Gordon to the Chase. According to France, "There were too many things that went on Saturday night that provided a clear disadvantage (to the #24 team)" for him not to take this action. Ironically, Joey Logano, one of the drivers involved in the controversy, set a new track qualifying record, qualifying on pole with a time of 28.509 seconds, and speed of 189.414 mph.

Results

Qualifying

Race results

Notes

 Points include 3 Chase for the Sprint Cup points for winning, 1 point for leading a lap, and 1 point for most laps led.

Standings after the race

Drivers' Championship standings

Manufacturers' Championship standings

Note: Only the first thirteen positions are included for the driver standings.

References

GEICO 400
GEICO 400
GEICO 400
NASCAR races at Chicagoland Speedway